Bandar-e Chiruiyeh (also Romanized as Bandar-e Chīrūīyeh; also known as ’Abrūyeh, Bandar-e Chīrū, Cherūyeh, Chīrū, Chīrūīyeh, and Chīrūyeh) is a village in Moqam Rural District, Shibkaveh District, Bandar Lengeh County, Hormozgan Province, Iran. At the 2006 census, its population was 584, in 86 families.

References 

Populated places in Bandar Lengeh County